Easter Tournament in Prague was an annual spring international football tournament held in Prague, Czechoslovakia, from 1924 to 1961 with interruptions. The tournament was held in the month of March-April.

The teams played 3 round-robin 90-minute matches in the tournament.

Finals

External links
 International Tournaments (Praha) at Rec.Sport.Soccer Statistics Foundation.
 Velikonocní Turnaj in 1961 in Praha at Rec.Sport.Soccer Statistics Foundation.

Czech football friendly trophies
Czechoslovakian football friendly trophies
Sport in Prague